IT RPM, or IT resource performance management, is a concept employed within the discipline of IT service management. In practice, it is a combination of technologies and processes which combine social collaboration, mobility tools and gamification in order to provide higher quality support in a service desk environment. It is typically under-pinned by best practices like ITIL, COBIT or Lean Six Sigma for Service Management.

Key concepts
 Device-agnostic tools (e.g. anywhere access from nearly any type of computing device) 
 IT to IT use / Business to IT use, as well as crowdsourced support
 Management reports and leaderboards to unite, encourage and reward staff for goal achievements 
 Capturing ad-hoc (out-of-band) communications to harness user knowledge
 Game mechanic theories to identify latent skills in groups of staff or individuals
 Predictive knowledge management to provide faster end-user support; typically deployed through self-service portals or decision tree technologies
 Using surveys and peer feedback for continuous improvement

See also
 Social media
 Gamification
 Incentive-centered design

Social media
Knowledge industry